Simon Min Sze, or Shi Min (born 1936), is a Chinese-American electrical engineer. He is best known for inventing the floating-gate MOSFET with Korean electrical engineer Dawon Kahng in 1967.

Biography
Sze was born in Nanjing, Jiangsu, and grew up in Taiwan. After graduating from the National Taiwan University in 1957, he received a master's degree from the University of Washington in 1960 and a doctorate from Stanford University in 1963. He worked for Bell Labs until 1990, after which he returned to Taiwan and joined the faculty of National Chiao Tung University.  He is well known for his work in semiconductor physics and technology, including his 1967 invention (with Dawon Kahng) of the floating-gate transistor, now widely used in non-volatile semiconductor memory devices.  He has written and edited many books, including Physics of Semiconductor Devices, one of the most-cited texts in its field.  Sze received the J. J. Ebers Award in 1991 for his work in electron devices.<ref>[http://www.ieee.org/portal/pages/society/eds/awards/ebers.html Electron Devices Society J.J. Ebers Award], web page at the IEEE, accessed 11-I-2007.</ref> In 1995, he was elected a member of the National Academy of Engineering for technical and educational contributions to semiconductor devices.

Bibliography
 Physics of Semiconductor Devices, S. M. Sze. New York: Wiley, 1969, ; 2nd ed., 1981, ; 3rd ed., with Kwok K. Ng, 2006, .
 Nonvolatile Memories: Materials, Devices and Applications" 2-volume set, Tseung-Yuen Tseng and Simon M. Sze.  Los Angeles: American Scientific Publishers, 2012; .
 Semiconductor Devices: Physics and Technology, S. M. Sze.  New York: Wiley, 1985; 2nd ed., 2001, ; 3rd ed., 2012, .
 VLSI Technology, ed. S. M. Sze. New York: McGraw-Hill, 1983, ; 2nd ed., 1988, .
 Modern Semiconductor Device Physics, ed. S. M. Sze.  New York: John Wiley & Sons, Inc., 1998, .

References

1936 births
American electrical engineers
Living people
American people of Taiwanese descent
National Taiwan University alumni
Scientists at Bell Labs
American people of Chinese descent
Members of the United States National Academy of Engineering
20th-century Chinese inventors
Engineers from Jiangsu
Taiwanese people from Jiangsu
Scientists from Nanjing
University of Washington alumni
Stanford University alumni
Academic staff of the National Chiao Tung University
Foreign members of the Chinese Academy of Engineering